St. Nicholas Orthodox Church, Tallinn is an Orthodox church in Tallinn, Estonia. The church is named after Saint Nicholas. The church is chosen one of the Estonian cultural monuments being both architectural monument and historical monument.

The church is built during 1820–1827. The church was designed by Luigi Rusca. The church is featured predominantly by classicism.

References

External links

Churches in Tallinn
Churches completed in 1827
19th-century churches in Estonia
Eastern Orthodox churches in Estonia
Tallinn Old Town